Marian Velicu (born July 4, 1977 in Comana, Giurgiu) is a boxer from Romania, who won the bronze medal in the Men's Light Flyweight (– 48 kg) division at the 2000 European Amateur Boxing Championships in Tampere, Finland. A year later he captured the silver medal in the same weight division at the World Amateur Boxing Championships in Belfast.

Velicu represented his native country at the 2000 Summer Olympics in Sydney, Australia. There he was stopped in the second round of the Men's Light Flyweight division by Cuba's eventual bronze medalist Maikro Romero.

References
 sports-reference

1977 births
Living people

Flyweight boxers
Boxers at the 2000 Summer Olympics
Olympic boxers of Romania
Romanian male boxers
AIBA World Boxing Championships medalists